Trine Beate Strand (born December 18, 1972) is a Norwegian sport wrestler.

She won a bronze medal at the 1989 World Wrestling Championships in Martigny, and a silver medal at the 1993 World Wrestling Championships in Stavern.

References

1972 births
Living people
Norwegian female sport wrestlers
World Wrestling Championships medalists
Sportspeople from Kristiansund
20th-century Norwegian women